Addi Lihtsi is an exclosure located in the Dogu'a Tembien woreda of the Tigray Region in Ethiopia. The area is protected by the local community.

Environmental characteristics
 Area: 412 ha
 Average slope gradient: 30%
 Aspect: the exclosure is oriented towards the south
 Minimum altitude: 1491 metres
 Maximum altitude: 1874 metres
 Lithology: Antalo Limestone and Adigrat Sandstone
 2017: support by the EthioTrees project

Management
As a general rule, cattle ranging and wood harvesting are not allowed. The grasses are harvested once yearly and taken to the homesteads of the village to feed livestock. Field observations showed that no illegal grazing occurred in the exclosure in 2018.

Benefits for the community
Setting aside such areas fits with the long-term vision of the communities were hiza’iti lands are set aside for use by the future generations. It has also direct benefits for the community:
 improved ground water availability
 honey production
 incense (oil) production
 
 climate ameliorator (temperature, moisture)
 the sequestered carbon is certified using the Plan Vivo voluntary carbon standard, after which carbon credits are sold
 the revenues are then reinvested in the villages, according to the priorities of the communities; it may be for an additional class in the village school, a water pond, conservation in the exclosures, or a store for incense.

References

External links
 EthioTrees on Davines website
 EthioTrees project website
 EthioTrees on Plan Vivo website
 Link For Forestry Projects

2017 establishments in Ethiopia
Land management
Environmental conservation
Greenhouse gas emissions
Emissions reduction
Carbon finance
Exclosures of Tigray Region
Dogu'a Tembien